Bjorelvnes is a village in Senja Municipality in Troms og Finnmark county, Norway. Lenvik Church is located in Bjorelvnes.

References

Villages in Troms
Senja